The More Things Change may refer to:
"The More Things Change", a song by Cinderella on their 1990 album Heartbreak Station
The More Things Change..., a 1997 album by Machine Head
"The More Things Change", a song by Bon Jovi on their 2010 album Greatest Hits
"The more things change, the more they remain the same" (q:plus ça change, plus c'est la même chose), an aphorism by Jean-Baptiste Alphonse Karr